Babicka is a 2003 Czech drama film directed by Ales Fajx. The film's music was composed by Livores Mortis.

Cast
 Bohumir Fajx
 Marie Hlubuckova
 David Kostelecky
 Věra Kubánková
 Ivana Stejskalová

References

External links
 

2003 films
2000s Czech-language films
Czech drama films
2003 drama films
2000s Czech films